Başıbozuk is the mix album of Turkish alternative rock band Mor ve Ötesi. It was released on 24 November 2008. The first three tracks are all candidate songs that Mor ve Ötesi had for the Eurovision Song Contest 2008 in Belgrade, Serbia when they were selected to represent Turkey; Of those, Deli was selected. The rest of the songs in the track are remixes and live performances.

Track listing
 Deli
 İddia
 Sonbahar
 Kış Geliyor (Canlı)
 Re (Canlı)
 Bir Derdim Var (Canlı)
 Parti - Flatliners Killa Remix
 Kördüğüm - dEmian & Emre Remix
 Ayıp Olmaz Mı? - Kaan Düzarat & Fuchs Rework
 Küçük Sevgilim - Kaan Düzarat Remix
 Darbe - Burak Güven & Serkan Hökenek Remix
 Çocuklar ve Hayvanlar - DJ Kambo Remix
 Deli - Luna Remix by Cihan Barış
 İddia - Kerem Kabadayı & Serkan Hökenek Remix

References

2008 albums
Mor ve Ötesi albums

tr:Başıbozuk